Warsaw Film Festival (abbreviated as WFF) is an annual film festival held every October in Warsaw, Poland which previews new films of all genres, including documentaries from all around the world. The festival has been held every year since 1985. In 2008, it was recognized by FIAPF as a competitive film festival specialised in first and second features and films from Central and Eastern Europe.

The festival is host to the International Federation of Film Critics awards for enterprising filmmaking in Central Europe and beyond (i.e. Denmark and Israel). The 38th edition will take place between 14 October to 23 October 2022.

Festival

Programmes
The programme consists of the following sections:
 The International Competition – premiering competition for international features
 1–2 Competition – for 1st and 2nd feature films 
 Free Spirit Competition – competition for independent, innovative, rebellious feature length fiction and documentary films from all over the world.
 Documentary Competition
 Shorts Competition – For narrative, documentary and animated shorts (up to 40 minutes) from all over the world. Winners are Academy Awards eligible.
 Special Screenings – non competitive section dedicated to acclaimed filmmakers from all over the world
 Discoveries 
 Family Cinema Weekend

All the films presented, regardless of the section (competitive or non-competitive), are eligible for the Audience Award.

Juries
International Competition Jury
The Competition 1–2 Jury
Free Spirit Competition Jury
Documentary Competition Jury
Shorts Competition Jury
Jury FIPRESCI
Jury NETPAC
Ecumenical jury - by SIGNIS

History

1985 – Film Discussion Club "Hybrydy" founds the festival, originally named Warsaw Film Week. Festival's creator Roman Gutek becomes its first director.
1991 – Stefan Laudyn becomes new director of the festival and name Warsaw Film Week changes to Warsaw Film Festival.
1995 – festival is being organised by Warsaw Film Found for the first time
2000 – festival gets accreditation from FIAPF and changes its name again into Warsaw International Film Festival
2005 – for the first time FIAPF juror gives special awards during Warsaw International Film Festival
2008 – FIAPF adds Warsaw International Film Festival to a group of international contest festival (which other members are Cannes, Berlin, Venice, Locarno, San Sebastian, Mar del Plata, Karlovy Vary, Montreal, Cairo, Moscow, Tokyo and Shanghai)

Award winners

International Competition winners 
Grand Prix

References

Film festivals in Poland
Recurring events established in 1985
Events in Warsaw
1985 establishments in Poland
Film festivals established in 1985
Autumn events in Poland